On 16 July 1960, after taking off from Copenhagen Airport at 15.38 local time, a de Havilland Dragon Rapide plane, (registration OY-DZY) chartered to the Danish Football Association, crashed into the Øresund about 50 metres from shore after the pilot lost control of the aircraft in severe weather. All eight passengers died; the pilot survived but required a leg to be amputated.

Footballers
The plane was carrying eight association football players to Herning Airport for a final trial match at Herning stadium to select the Danish squad for the 1960 Olympic tournament. Three of the eight had been provisionally selected for the squad; the rest were B-team and youth internationals with a last chance to impress the selectors.

The dead were:

Two fishermen found pilot Stig Vindeløv alive in the wreckage, along with Per Funch Jensen, who died en route to hospital.

Second aircraft
A smaller plane waiting for clearance to take off when the accident occurred was due to carry four other players to the same match: Erik Dyreborg, Hans Christian Andersen, Bent Jørgensen, and Bjarne Eklund. These were all youth players. Dyreborg was demoted from the first plane to make room for a kit basket.

Olympics
After the accident, the Danish FA considered withdrawing from the Olympic tournament.  In the event, they won the silver medal, losing to Yugoslavia in the final.

See also
 List of accidents involving sports teams

References

Aviation accidents and incidents in 1960
Accidents and incidents involving the de Havilland Dragon Rapide
Aviation accidents and incidents in Denmark
Football at the 1960 Summer Olympics
Olympic deaths
Aviation accidents and incidents involving professional sports teams
1960 in Denmark
1960 in Danish football
Denmark at the Men's Olympic Football Tournament
July 1960 events in Europe
Disasters in Copenhagen
1960 disasters in Denmark